In mathematics, an L-function is a meromorphic function on the complex plane, associated to one out of several categories of mathematical objects. An L-series is a Dirichlet series, usually convergent on a half-plane, that may give rise to an L-function via analytic continuation. The Riemann zeta function is an example of an L-function, and one important conjecture involving L-functions is the Riemann hypothesis and its generalization.

The theory of L-functions has become a very substantial, and still largely conjectural, part of contemporary analytic number theory. In it, broad generalisations of the Riemann zeta function and the L-series for a Dirichlet character are constructed, and their general properties, in most cases still out of reach of proof, are set out in a systematic way.  Because of the Euler product formula there is a deep connection between L-functions and the theory of prime numbers.

The mathematical field that studies L-functions is sometimes called analytic theory of L-functions.

Construction 

We distinguish at the outset between the L-series, an infinite series representation (for example the Dirichlet series for the Riemann zeta function), and the L-function, the function in the complex plane that is its analytic continuation. The general constructions start with an L-series, defined first as a Dirichlet series, and then by an expansion as an Euler product indexed by prime numbers. Estimates are required to prove that this converges in some right half-plane of the complex numbers. Then one asks whether the function so defined can be analytically continued to the rest of the complex plane (perhaps with some poles).

It is this (conjectural) meromorphic continuation to the complex plane which is called an L-function. In the classical cases, already, one knows that useful information is contained in the values and behaviour of the L-function at points where the series representation does not converge. The general term L-function here includes many known types of zeta functions. The Selberg class is an attempt to capture the core properties of L-functions in a set of axioms, thus encouraging the study of the properties of the class rather than of individual functions.

Conjectural information 

One can list characteristics of known examples of L-functions that one would wish to see generalized:

 location of zeros and poles;
 functional equation, with respect to some vertical line Re(s) = constant;
 interesting values at integers related to quantities from algebraic K-theory.

Detailed work has produced a large body of plausible conjectures, for example about the exact type of functional equation that should apply. Since the Riemann zeta function connects through its values at positive even integers (and negative odd integers) to the Bernoulli numbers, one looks for an appropriate generalisation of that phenomenon. In that case results have been obtained for p-adic L-functions, which describe certain Galois modules.

The statistics of the zero distributions are of interest  because of their connection to problems like the generalized Riemann hypothesis, distribution of prime numbers, etc. The connections with random matrix theory and quantum chaos are also of interest. The fractal structure of the distributions has been studied using rescaled range analysis. The self-similarity of the zero distribution is quite remarkable, and is characterized by a large fractal dimension of 1.9. This rather large fractal dimension is found over zeros covering at least fifteen orders of magnitude for the Riemann zeta function, and also for the zeros of other L-functions of different orders and conductors.

Birch and Swinnerton-Dyer conjecture 

One of the influential examples, both for the history of the more general L-functions and as a still-open research problem, is the conjecture developed by Bryan Birch and Peter Swinnerton-Dyer in the early part of the 1960s. It applies to an elliptic curve E, and the problem it attempts to solve is the prediction of the rank of the elliptic curve over the rational numbers (or another global field): i.e. the number of free generators of its group of rational points. Much previous work in the area began to be unified around a better knowledge of L-functions. This was something like a paradigm example of the nascent theory of L-functions.

Rise of the general theory 

This development preceded the Langlands program by a few years, and can be regarded as complementary to it: Langlands' work relates largely to Artin L-functions, which, like Hecke L-functions, were defined several decades earlier, and to L-functions attached to general automorphic representations.

Gradually it became clearer in what sense the construction of Hasse–Weil zeta functions might be made to work to provide valid L-functions, in the analytic sense: there should be some input from analysis, which meant automorphic analysis. The general case now unifies at a conceptual level a number of different research programs.

See also

Generalized Riemann hypothesis
Dirichlet L-function
Automorphic L-function
Modularity theorem
Artin conjecture
Special values of L-functions
Explicit formulae for L-functions
Shimizu L-function

References

External links
 

Articles about a breakthrough third degree transcendental L-function